Zonitis atripennis is a species of blister beetle in the family Meloidae. It is found in North America.

Subspecies
These two subspecies belong to the species Zonitis atripennis:
 Zonitis atripennis atripennis (Say, 1823)
 Zonitis atripennis terminalis Enns, 1956

References

Further reading

 

Meloidae
Articles created by Qbugbot
Beetles described in 1823